Shenkursk is a town and the administrative center of Shenkursky District in Arkhangelsk Oblast, Russia, located on the right bank of the Vaga River. Population:

Geography

Climate

History

Shenkursk was first mentioned in documents of Novgorod merchants in 1229. In 1315, it was bought by a Novgorod posadnik. Ivan the Terrible referred to this location as the town of Vaga and included it into his oprichnina. At that time, there was a timber fort and a residence of local bishops.

Tsar Feodor I made a grant of Shenkursk to his brother-in-law, Boris Godunov, who bequeathed it to his future son-in-law, Johan of Schleswig-Holstein, who died shortly after arriving to Russia. The Romanovs presented the area to Prince Dmitry Troubetskoy as his votchina. Upon his death, the town was returned to the crown. In 1640–1643, the Tsar ordered a new fortress to be built in Shenkursk. Catherine the Great chartered Shenkursk in 1780, and Shenkursk became the seat of the newly established Shenkursky Uyezd in Vologda Viceroyalty (from 1796, in Arkhangelsk Governorate).

Shenkursk played a prominent role in the Russian Civil War. In the autumn of 1918, about six thousand British and American troops advanced south of Shenkursk. On January 19–25, the Bolshevik troops staged a counteroffensive, known as the Battle of Shenkursk.

Shenkursky Uyezd remained in Arkhangelsk Governorate until 1929, when several governorates were merged into Northern Krai and redistricted. In 1936, the krai was transformed into Northern Oblast. In 1937, Northern Oblast was split into Arkhangelsk Oblast and Vologda Oblast.

Administrative and municipal status
Within the framework of administrative divisions, Shenkursk serves as the administrative center of Shenkursky District. As an administrative division, it is incorporated within Shenkursky District as the town of district significance of Shenkursk. As a municipal division, the town of district significance of Shenkursk is incorporated within Shenkursky Municipal District as Shenkurskoye Urban Settlement.

Economy

Industry
There is timber industry and food industry, including milk production.

Transportation
Shenkursk is located several kilometers east from the M8 Highway—one of the principal highways in Russia—connecting Moscow and Arkhangelsk; however, it lies on the other bank of the Vaga and is only connected with the highway by a ferry crossing. The roads on the right bank of the Vaga are of minor importance and unpaved.

The Vaga is navigable, but there is no passenger navigation.

Culture and recreation
The town contains twenty-one objects classified as cultural and historical heritage of local importance. Most of these are merchant houses built prior to 1917 and the remains of the former Holy Trinity Monastery.

Shenkursk hosts the Shenkursky District Museum.

Notable people
 Ratmir Kholmov (1925–2006), Russian chess Grandmaster

References

Notes

Sources

External links
Unofficial website of Shenkursk 

Cities and towns in Arkhangelsk Oblast
Populated places established in the 13th century
Shenkursky Uyezd